The flag of Jordan, officially adopted on 16 April 1928, is based on the 1916 flag of the Arab Revolt against the Ottoman Empire during World War I. The flag consists of horizontal black, white, and green bands that are connected by a red chevron. The colours are the Pan-Arab Colors, respectively representing the Abbasid (black band), Umayyad (white band), and Fatimid or Rashidun  caliphates (green band). The red chevron is for the Hashemite dynasty, and the Arab Revolt.

Features

In addition to the bands and chevron, a white star with seven points is featured on the hoist side of the red chevron. The star stands for the unity of the Arab people; its seven points refer to the seven verses of Al-Fatiha as well as the seven hills Amman was built on.

History

Interpretation of the colors

Colours scheme

Construction Sheet

Historical flags

Military flags

See also 
Flag of the Arab Revolt
Palestinian flag
Kingdom of Hejaz

References

External links
 

Flag
 
Jordan